WZQQ (97.9 FM) is a radio station operated by Leslie County Broadcasting with studios on Main Street in Hazard, Kentucky. It airs a classic rock music format.

The station has been assigned these call letters by the Federal Communications Commission since February 12, 2019.

References

External links

ZQQ (FM)
Classic rock radio stations in the United States
Leslie County, Kentucky
Radio stations established in 1989
1989 establishments in Kentucky